Stenomesseae was a tribe (in the family Amaryllidaceae, subfamily Amaryllidoideae), where it forms part of the Andean clade, one of two American clades. The tribe was originally described by Traub in his monograph on the Amaryllidaceae in 1963, as Stenomessae based on the type genus Stenomesson. In 1995 it was recognised that Eustephieae was a distinct group separate from the other Stenomesseae. Subsequently, the Müller-Doblies' (1996) divided tribe Eustephieae into two subtribes, Stenomessinae and Eustephiinae.

The advent of molecular phylogenetics showed that the Stemomesseae (including Stenomesson) was polyphyletic. Consequently, a separate tribe (Clinantheae) was created from one group and the remainder, which segregated with Eucharideae was treated as another tribe. Initially it was suggested that this combined tribe be referred to as a newly circumscribed Stenomesseae, but subsequently the term Eucharideae has been conserved.

Taxonomy

Phylogeny 
The placement of Stenomesseae, now Eucharideae within subfamily Amaryllidoideae is shown in the following cladogram.

References

Bibliography

 , in 
 
(additional excerpts)
 
 
 
 
 
 
 
 
 , in

External links 

Amaryllidoideae
Asparagales tribes
Historically recognized angiosperm taxa